The Lonely One...  is a studio album by jazz pianist Bud Powell, released in 1959 by Verve. It contains three sessions that Powell recorded at Fine Sound Studios in New York in 1955.

The album was released as a CD replica by Verve (Japan) in 2006 (POCJ-2742). The sessions (with alternate takes) are also available on The Complete Bud Powell on Verve (1994) CD box-set.

History
The first three tracks here, with the four tracks that appeared on Piano Interpretations, complete the April 27 session as far as master takes go. "Willow Weep for Me" from the April 25 session had already appeared on Piano Interpretations.

The January 13 session has excited comment:

Track listing 12" LP (MGV 8301)
Side A
"Confirmation" (Charlie Parker) – 4:24
"Star Eyes" (Gene De Paul, Don Raye) – 3:32
"Lullaby in Rhythm" (Clarence Profit, Edgar Sampson, Benny Goodman, Walter Hirsch) – 3:53
"Willow Weep for Me" (Ann Ronnell) – 4:43
"Mediocre" – 2:59
Side B
"All the Things You Are" (Jerome Kern, Oscar Hammerstein II) – 3:33
"Epistrophy" (Thelonious Monk, Kenny Clarke) – 3:03
"Dance of the Infidels" – 2:21
"Salt Peanuts" (Dizzy Gillespie, Clarke) – 2:22
"Hey George" (aka "Sweet Georgia Brown") (Maceo Pinkard, Kenneth Casey) – 3:27

Personnel

Performance
Bud Powell – piano
April 27, 1955, side A tracks 1-3. April 25, 1955, side A track 4. Fine Sound Studios, New York.
George Duvivier – bass
Art Taylor – drums
January 13, 1955, side A track 5 and side B tracks 1-5. Fine Sound Studios, New York.
Percy Heath – bass
Kenny Clarke – drums

Production
Norman Granz – producer
Sheldon Marks – art director
Howard Morehead – cover photo

References

Bud Powell albums
1959 albums
Albums produced by Norman Granz
Verve Records albums